St Patrick's Island is the most distant of three low-lying uninhabited islets off the headland of Skerries, County Dublin in Ireland. It is an island of low cliffs and lies about 1.5 km from the mainland, with vegetation consisting of grasses, brambles and other species such as hogweed. It is the most important of the three islands for breeding seabirds. Cormorant, shag and herring gull are the most prominent species.

In 1148 the Primate Gelasius, Archbishop of Armagh and Papal Legate St. Malachy convened a synod on this island. Fifteen bishops, over two-hundred priests, and many other clergy attended with the intention of reforming the Irish church. The synod is recorded in the continuation of the Annals of the Four Masters, the Annals of Inisfallen, and the continuator of the Annals of Tigernach.

References

External links
 www.skerrieshomepage.f2s.com
 www.skerrieshomepage.com
 encyclopedia.farlex.com

Islands of County Dublin
Uninhabited islands of Ireland